The Karl Vogt Building is a historic apartment building at 6811 Hickory Street in Tinley Park, Illinois. Merchant and German immigrant Karl Vogt, the brother of future village president Henry Vogt, built the building in 1872. While Vogt expected the building would house workers on a planned Rock Island Railroad junction in Tinley Park, the junction was canceled after the Great Chicago Fire, and the building's construction costs bankrupted Vogt. The building has an Italianate design, a popular choice in the mid-to-late nineteenth century; it is the only example of the style in Tinley Park. Its design includes a two-story porch with balustrades on each floor, tall windows with limestone lintels and keystones, and a cornice with ornamental brackets and moldings.

The building was added to the National Register of Historic Places on January 21, 1988.

References

Buildings and structures on the National Register of Historic Places in Cook County, Illinois
Residential buildings on the National Register of Historic Places in Illinois
Apartment buildings in Illinois
Residential buildings completed in 1872
Italianate architecture in Illinois
Tinley Park, Illinois